Eric Weatherhat was a legendary king of Sweden.

According to the Swedish Chronicle, the cognomen Weatherhat refers to the accommodating wind he enjoyed whilst pillaging in the Baltic Sea region.

His place in the Swedish line of kings is mysterious, and so he is either considered to be the same as Eric Anundsson or, according to Gesta Danorum, one of Ragnar Lodbrok's sons.

See also
 Saxo's kings of Sweden

Mythological kings of Sweden
9th-century Swedish people